The 2008 Sky Poker World Grand Prix was the eleventh World Grand Prix darts tournament held by the Professional Darts Corporation. It was held from 6–12 October 2008 at the Citywest Hotel in Dublin, Ireland. The event featured a tournament record prize fund of £250,000 with £50,000 going to the winner.

Phil Taylor won his eighth Grand Prix title with a 6-2 victory over Raymond van Barneveld in the final watched by 355,000 viewers. James Wade was the defending champion, however lost 2-1 to Tony Eccles in the first round.

Format
All legs were 501 points double-in double-out format. The first round games were best of three sets. Second round games were best of five sets, the quarter finals best of seven sets, the semi finals best of nine sets, and the final was best of eleven sets. All sets were best of five legs/first to three legs.

Prize money
A tournament record prize fund of £250,000 was available to the participants, divided based on the following performances:

Qualification
The field of 32 players was mostly made up from the top sixteen players in the PDC Order of Merit on September 21, following the two Players Championship events at the Newport Center in Newport, Wales. The top eight from these rankings were also the seeded players. The remaining sixteen places went to the top twelve non-qualified players from the 2008 Players Championship Order of Merit, and then to the top four non-qualified residents of the Republic of Ireland and Northern Ireland from the 2008 Players Championship Order of Merit who have competed in at least six Players Championship events.

Draw
Draw and schedule of play was as follows:

Television coverage and sponsorship
The tournament was screened by Sky Sports.

The sponsorship for the tournament was Sky Bet who had sponsored the event since 2004, however one of its brands, Sky Poker, was the new title sponsor.

References

External links
World Grand Prix page on the PDC's official website

World Grand Prix (darts)
World Grand Prix Darts